Kamar Khani (also Romanized as Kamar Khānī; also known as Kalūgān) is a village in Rudbar-e Qasran Rural District, Rudbar-e Qasran District, Shemiranat County, Tehran Province, Iran. At the 2006 census, its population was 44, in 13 families.

References 

Populated places in Shemiranat County